Johannes Benzing (born in Schwenningen on 13 January 1913; died 16 March 2001) was a German Turkic specialist and diplomat in the era of National Socialism and in the Federal Republic of Germany. Benzing worked as a Linguist in Pers Z S, the signals intelligence agency of the German Foreign Office.  He was the youngest senior official (German:Beamter) and headed the section from October 1939 until September 1944.

Life 
After high school, Benzing discovered his profound interest in scholarly issues. In 1938, Benzing moved to Berlin to take up Oriental Studies. At the Humboldt University of Berlin, Benzing studied Islamic philology with Richard Hartmann, Hans Heinrich Schaeder and Walther Björkman, and Turcology with Annemarie von Gabain, and Mongolistics with Erich Haenisch. At the same time, he acquired practical knowledge of oriental languages at the Oriental Seminar, where Gotthard Jäschke and Sebastian Beck were among his teachers. He also learnt Tatar from Saadet Ishaki (Çagatay), the daughter of the famous Tatar intellectual Ayaz İshaki. In 1939, Benzing took his examination for promotion of Dr. phil with a thesis on the verbal system of Turkmen, Über die Verbformen im Türkmenischen. In 1942, Benzing habilitated with a thorough study on the subject Chuvash language, called Tschuwaschische Forschungen. At that time, in the middle of the war, Benzing was unable to get an adequate position at a university. Instead he found an occupation in the Ministry of Foreign Affairs. He became a member of the SA in June 1936, and joined the NSDAP in October 1940. From 1937 onwards he held various functions within the NSDAP.

He was interned between 1945 and 1946. There is no information available about his denazification. He worked for the French Ministry of Foreign Affairs, between 1950 and 1955 in Paris, where he established close contacts with the leading French Orientalists (Orientalism). In 1953, he was elected a member of the Oriental Commission of the newly established Academy of Sciences and Literature at Mainz. In 1955, he joined the Ministry of Foreign Affairs of the Federal Republic of Germany and was one year later appointed consul of the Cultural Section at the Consulate General in Istanbul. Besides his diplomatic duties, Benzing gave courses in Turkic languages at the Turcological Department of the Faculty of Letters (Turkish:Edebiyat Fakültesi) of the University of Istanbul. Sporadically he also taught Turcology at the German universities of Tübingen and Mainz. On 4 December 1963 Johannes Benzing was appointed full professor (German:Ordinarius) in Oriental studies (Islamic philology and Islamic studies) (German:Islamische Philologie and Islamkunde) at the Faculty of Art, Johannes Gutenberg University Mainz, as the successor of Professor Helmuth Scheel. On 25 February 1966 he was elected Ordinary Member of the Academy of Sciences and Literature in Mainz. In 1973, he moved to become Professor of the Oriental Studies, Department of Philology in Mainz, which he continued until 1981.

Together with his fellow professors Georg Buddruss and Helmut Humbach, he arranged interdisciplinary seminars on Central Asian languages, e.g. Pamir languages, Tajik, Khotanese and Tokharian. It was also Benzing who took the initiative to establish Iranistics as an academic discipline at Mainz.

Benzing always dealt with the written word in a highly economic way and communicated many of his boldest – and perhaps most fruitful – ideas in oral discussions only, without ever committing them to paper. After the long mobile phases of his life, he did not want to leave Mainz, which meant that he never attended conferences and congresses. On the other hand, he permanently welcomed visiting scholars from all parts of the world, generously sharing his wide knowledge and deep insights with them.

On 31 March 1981 Benzing retired from his position at the University of Mainz. Soon after the retirement, he and his wife Käte left Mainz and settled in the borough of Erdmannsweiler in Königsfeld im Schwarzwald, close to their birthplace in the Black Forest. In March 1998, they moved to Bovenden to stay with their daughter, Professor Brigitta Benzing-Wolde Georgis, and her husband, Dr. Kahsai Wolde Georgis.

Work

With his profound knowledge and wide perspective, Benzing continued the tradition of Willi Bang-Kaup's Berlin school of linguistic Turcology, though broadening its scope and refining its scholarly working procedures. Besides publishing books and articles, Johannes Benzing devoted much time and care to highly instructive book reviews containing profound analyses and complementary remarks on important scholarly questions. A selection of these reviews: Critical contributions to ancient literature and Turkology (German: Kritische Beiträge zur Altaistik und Turkologie), appeared in 1988 as volume 3 in the series Turcologica magazine (Harrassowitz). Historical-comparative research on Turkic, Tungusic and Mongolic languages was Benzing's main field of interest, to which he contributed outstanding studies. One example of this is Benzing's critical occupation with the so-called Altaic question, the still controversial problem of a possible genetic relatedness of Turkic, Mongolic and Tungusic (maybe even Korean and Japanese). In a truly visionary paper: Menless land: Inner and North Asia as a philological work area  (German:Herrenloses Land: Inner und Nordasien als philologisches Arbeitsgebiet), he argued that the ‘ownerless’ territory of Inner and Northern Asia, filling a fifth of the world's surface, should finally be subject to comprehensive scholarly study.

Dr Johannes Benzing joined Pers Z S on 20 July 1937. He was the youngest senior Beamter in the Pers Z S unit. A linguist, he was a specialist in Near Eastern languages and originally worked under Dr Scherschmidt. He headed this section from October 1939 until September 1944. He was then placed in charge of work for Iranian, Iraqi and Afghanistani systems.

Publications 

 Bolgarisch-tschuwaschische Studien. Harrassowitz, Wiesbaden 1988
 Critical contributions to Altaistic and Turkology (German: Kritische Beiträge zur Altaistik und Turkologie), Harrassowitz, Wiesbaden 1988
 Kalmyk grammar for reference (German: Kalmückische Grammatik zum Nachschlagen), Harrassowitz, Wiesbaden 1985
 Chwaresmischer Wortindex, Harrassowitz, Wiesbaden 1983
 Islamic jurisprudence as a folklore source (German: Islamische Rechtsgutachten als volkskundliche Quelle), Akademie der Wiss. u.d. Literatur, Mainz 1977
 Die tungusischen Sprachen : Versuch e. vergl. Grammatik. Verl. d. Akad. d. Wiss. u.d. Literatur, Mainz 1955
 Lamutische Grammatik : Mit Bibliographie, Sprachproben u. Glossar. Steiner, Wiesbaden 1955
 Introduction to the Study of Altaic philology and Turkish Studies (German: Einführung in das Studium der altaischen Philologie und der Turkologie) . Harrassowitz, Wiesbaden 1953
 Deutsch-tschuwaschisches Wörterverzeichnis nebst kurzem tschuwaschischen Sprachführer. O. Stollberg, Berlin 1943
 Turkestan, The Library of Ostraumes:  (German: Turkestan, Die Bücherei des Ostraumes) : Special publication (German: Sonderveröffentlichung), ebd. 1943
 About the verb forms in Turcoman (German: Über die Verbformen im Türkmenischen), Berlin, Diss. phil. 1939
 The chwaresmische language material, of a manuscript of "Muqaddimat al-Adab" (Arabic-Persian dictionary) (German: Das chwaresmische Sprachmaterial einer Handschrift der "Muqaddimat al-Adab"), Steiner, Wiesbaden 1968

Literature

References

External links 
Johannes Benzing

1913 births
2001 deaths
People from Villingen-Schwenningen
People from the Kingdom of Württemberg
Nazi Party members
German diplomats
Linguists of Turkic languages
Linguistic research
Academic staff of Johannes Gutenberg University Mainz
Sturmabteilung personnel